Adolfo García Quesada (born 27 September 1979 in Granada) is a Spanish former cyclist. His brother, Carlos García Quesada also competed professionally. He rode in the 2003 Giro d'Italia, finishing in 18th place and the 2005 Vuelta a España for 35th position.

Major results

2000
 1st Stage 5 Vuelta a Navarra
 2nd Overall Circuito Montañés
2002
 1st Stage 5 Volta a Portugal
 2nd Clásica a los Puertos de Guadarrama
2003
 1st Stage 1 Vuelta a Burgos
2004
 1st Stage 5 Volta a Portugal
2005
 1st Overall Vuelta a Asturias
 3rd Prueba Villafranca de Ordizia
 3rd Overall Volta a Portugal
1st Stage 8
2006
 1st Stage 5 Volta a Catalunya
 2nd GP Llodio
 3rd Overall Vuelta a Andalucía
1st Stage 1
 3rd Clásica de Almería

References

External links

1979 births
Living people
Spanish male cyclists
Sportspeople from Granada
Cyclists from Andalusia